Sei Lá is a 2014 Portuguese romantic comedy film directed by Joaquim Leitão and based on a novel of the same name by Margarida Rebelo Pinto. It stars Leonor Seixas.

Cast
Leonor Seixas
Rita Pereira
Pedro Granger
Rui Unas
Tino Navarro
António Pedro Cerdeira
Paula Lobo Antunes

Reception
In Público's Ípsilon, Jorge Mourinha gave the film a rating of "bad" and Vasco Câmara gave it a rating of "mediocre".

References

External links

2014 films
2014 romantic comedy films
Films based on Portuguese novels
Films directed by Joaquim Leitão
Portuguese romantic comedy films
2010s Portuguese-language films